The Elfriede Grünberg Prize has been conferred annually since 2000 by the Austrian Welser Initiative Against Fascism for merits in the fight against Nazism. The award was named after the Holocaust victim Elfriede Grünberg.

Namesake 

Elfriede Grünberg (1929 - 1942) was murdered by the Nazi regime for racist reasons, like her mother and her aunt. Her father Max was able to emigrate to Shanghai in 1939. On June 9, 1942 Elfriede Grünberg and her mother were deported from Vienna to the Maly Trostenets extermination camp. Six days later, Elfriede was probably killed in a gas van.

Award recipients 
 2000 Johann Kalliauer, Rudolf Anschober, Wilhelm Achleitner, Raimund Buttinger
 2001 Reinhard Kannonier, Rudolf Kropf, Michael John, Erwin Peterseil
 2002 Waltraud Neuhauser, Karl Ramsmaier, Josef Adlmannseder, Günter Kalliauer
 2003 Herta Eva Schreiber, Rudolf Haunschmid, Albert Langanke, Wolfgang Quatember
 2004 Ursula Hüttmayr, Erich Gumplmaier, Andreas Gruber, Wolfgang Neugebauer
 2005 Ludwig Laher, Irmgard Schmidleithner, Gunther Trübswasser, Mümtaz Karakurt
 2006 Leopold Engleitner, Bernhard Rammerstorfer, Irmgard Aschbauer, Georg Oberhaidinger
 2007 Gülcan Gigl, Martin Kranzl-Greinecker, Gerhard Skiba, Norbert Leitner
 2008 Brigitte Geibinger, Gertraud Jahn, Anita Eyth, Norbert Trawöger
 2009 Thomas Böhler, Leo Furtlehner, Walter Hofstätter, Marie-José Simonet
 2010 Martha Gammer, Astrid Hackl, Ernst Huber, Rudolf Lehner
 2011 Peter Lechner, Andreas Maislinger, Gitta Martl, Uwe Sailer
 2012 Margit Hauft, Christian Schörkhuber, Karin Wagner, Peter Weidner
 2013 Anna Hackl, Sonja Ablinger, Maria Buchmayr, Mary Kreutzer
 2014 Mario Born, Hermann Hochreiter, Jürgen Pachner, Markus Rachbauer
 2015 Christian Brandlmaier, Peter Koits, Neue Mittelschule Gunskirchen, Wels hilft

External links 
 Reports and further information on the prize, at the site of the Welser Initiative Against Fascism (in German)

Holocaust commemoration
Austrian awards